Maude Jacques (born April 21, 1992) is a Canadian 2.5 point Paralympic wheelchair basketball player who won a gold medal at the 2014 Women's World Wheelchair Basketball Championship in Toronto.

Biography
Maude Jacques was born in Sherbrooke, Quebec, on April 21, 1992. She was introduced to wheelchair basketball in 2001 by her physiotherapist. She first played for a mini-team in her home town, and then for club teams. She represented Quebec at the 2011 Canada Games, where her team won a gold medal. That year she was selected first to the U25 national team, and then to the senior women's team. She played with the U25 team at the 2011 U25 World Championships in St. Catharines, Ontario, where Team Canada came fourth, and then the senior team at the 2011 Parapan American Games in Guadalajara, Mexico, where Team Canada came second. The following year she made her Paralympic debut at the 2012 Summer Paralympic Games in London, where Team Canada came sixth. Afterwards she joined the women's wheelchair basketball team at the University of Alabama. In July 2014, she was part of the team that won a gold medal at the 2014 Women's World Wheelchair Basketball Championship in Toronto. The University of Alabama wheelchair basketball team of which she was part won their fourth National Championship in the seven years in 2015 with a 58–52 win over the University of Illinois. In August 2015, she was part of the team that won silver at the 2015 Parapan American Games, but the following year she was omitted from the team for the 2016 Paralympic Games in Rio de Janeiro.

In wheelchair tennis, she won the Birmingham National Championships in 2015, becoming the Canadian national champion. She participated in the 2016 Alabama Open in August 2016, and the Birmingham National Championships in October 2016.

Awards
 Queen Elizabeth II Diamond Jubilee Medal  (2013)

References

External links
  (in French)

1992 births
Canadian women's wheelchair basketball players
French Quebecers
Living people
Paralympic wheelchair basketball players of Canada
Sportspeople from Sherbrooke
Wheelchair basketball players at the 2012 Summer Paralympics